Hastings Airport   is an airport serving Freetown, the capital city of Sierra Leone, a country in West Africa

Facilities 

References

External links
 

Airports in Sierra Leone